Super! is an Italian television channel owned by Paramount Networks EMEAA. The channel was launched on 1 September 2010 as DeA Super on Sky Italia. On 18 March 2012, it became free-to-air and changed name to Super!. The network official speaker is voice actor Renato Novara.

Programming 
Super! shows a variety of programs targeted towards children aged seven to thirteen.

Super! was the first Italian television channel airing a Korean drama, Dream High, from 1 September to 16 October 2013, the only K-drama broadcast in Italy. However, the series was heavily edited, and dubbed into Italian, names were changed to English alternatives (for example, Hye-mi became Sam, Sam-dong Brian, and Jin-guk Dylan), episodes split in two parts, some scenes cut to reduce the duration of the episodes or to censor the content unsuitable for young audiences, mainly blood.

During October 2019, a new programming block premiered, Chicchirichì Time, which is aimed at preschoolers, airing series like Shimmer and Shine and Bubble Guppies, however the block doesn't air preschool series anymore.

Programs and specials
 SpongeBob SquarePants
 Lego City Adventures
 Boy Girl Dog Cat Mouse Cheese
 Detective Conan
 Miraculous: Tales of Ladybug & Cat Noir
 Totally Spies!
 Henry Danger
 The Thundermans
 The Adventures of Jimmy Neutron: Boy Genius
 Kaeloo
 Sam & Cat
 Love Divina
 The Loud House
 Drake & Josh
 Nicky, Ricky, Dicky & Dawn
 Dawn of the Croods
 Home: Adventures with Tip & Oh
 Zak Storm
 Turbo FAST
 Dream High
 Fanboy & Chum Chum
 Kally's Mashup
 LoliRock

References

External links 
  

Television channels in Italy
Television stations in Switzerland
Italian-language television stations
Television channels and stations established in 2010
2010 establishments in Italy
Children's television networks
Paramount International Networks